The government of Zimbabwe Rhodesia took office on 1 June 1979 under the terms of the Internal Settlement negotiated between the government of Rhodesia and moderate African nationalists. It ruled the internationally unrecognized country until, under the terms of the Lancaster House Agreement, control was turned over to Lord Soames as the Governor of Southern Rhodesia on 12 December 1979.

The government attempted to include all parties represented in the House of Assembly following the general election, although the Zimbabwe African National Union of Rev Ndabaningi Sithole initially refused to take up their seats.

Executive Council

Deputy Ministers

See also
Cabinet of Rhodesia
Politics of Zimbabwe

Politics of Rhodesia
History of Zimbabwe
Zimbabwe Rhodesia
Cabinets established in 1979
Cabinets disestablished in 1979